Arto Tapio Ilmari Sirviö (born 6 January 1962) is a retired professional Finnish ice hockey player. Currently he is the head coach of Kristianstads IK.

Sirviö was born in Sotkamo, and began his professional career in 1979 with HIFK where he stayed for two seasons before joining Jokerit in 1981 where he remained for four seasons.  Sirviö then moved to Sweden in 1986 where in a seven-year spell, he played for Mora IK and Västra Frölunda.  In 1992, he returned to SM-liiga and spent four seasons with KalPa before having short spells with Kiekko-Espoo and Haukat.  He moved to Germany in 1996 with Rote Teufel Bad Nauheim and then returned to Sweden in 1997 with Gislaveds SK before retiring.

Career statistics

Regular season and playoffs

International

External links

1962 births
Espoo Blues players
Finnish ice hockey right wingers
Frölunda HC players
HIFK (ice hockey) players
Ice hockey players at the 1984 Winter Olympics
Jokerit players
KalPa players
Living people
Mora IK players
Olympic ice hockey players of Finland
People from Sotkamo
Rote Teufel Bad Nauheim players
Sportspeople from Kainuu